Two hundred and forty-three Guggenheim Fellowships were awarded in 1954.

1954 U.S. and Canadian Fellows

1954 Latin American and Caribbean Fellows

See also
 Guggenheim Fellowship
 List of Guggenheim Fellowships awarded in 1953
 List of Guggenheim Fellowships awarded in 1955

References

1954
1954 awards